The Neck of Land Cemetery is a small historic cemetery on Summer Street in Taunton, Massachusetts. Established in 1687 near the confluence of the Mill and Taunton Rivers, it was the city's first cemetery. Most of its graves predate 1800; there are four burials before 1700, including two children. The most significant individual buried in the cemetery is Taunton founder and first female colonial land claimer Elizabeth Poole.

The cemetery was listed on the National Register of Historic Places in 1985.

See also
 National Register of Historic Places listings in Taunton, Massachusetts

References

External links
 

National Register of Historic Places in Taunton, Massachusetts
1687 establishments in Massachusetts
Cemeteries on the National Register of Historic Places in Massachusetts
Buildings and structures in Taunton, Massachusetts
Cemeteries in Bristol County, Massachusetts
Cemeteries established in the 17th century